Romedal is a village in Stange municipality in Innlandet county, Norway.

The village was the administrative centre of the old Romedal Municipality which existed from 1838-1964.

References

Stange
Villages in Innlandet